Emma Dante (born 6 April 1967) is an Italian playwright, theatre director and stage actress. She wrote, directed and starred in the 2013 film A Street in Palermo. She later directed numerous operas, including Richard Strauss' Feuersnot and Hans Werner Henze's Gisela! in Palermo, and Carmen at the Teatro alla Scala. In 2020 she co-wrote and directed The Macaluso Sisters, based on her own acclaimed play.

References

External links 
Official website

1967 births
Living people
Italian film actresses
Italian stage actresses
Italian film directors
Italian women film directors
Italian screenwriters
Italian women screenwriters
Italian theatre directors
Women theatre directors
Italian opera directors
Female opera directors
Film people from Palermo
Actresses from Palermo
Italian women dramatists and playwrights
20th-century Italian dramatists and playwrights
21st-century Italian dramatists and playwrights